Fana Island, or Fanna Island, is a 40 ha, uplifted reef island in the state of Sonsorol in the Southwest Islands of Palau in Micronesia in the south-west Pacific Ocean. It is flat, low-lying and susceptible to storms. Although uninhabited, it is occasionally visited by people from nearby Sonsorol Island.

Environment
Fana is densely vegetated with Pisonia forest. It is home to large numbers of seabirds and coconut crabs, and its beaches are used for nesting by green sea turtles.

Important Bird Area
The island has been designated an Important Bird Area (IBA) by BirdLife International because it supports breeding colonies of red-footed boobies, black noddies and common white terns. Brown noddies, greater frigatebirds and brown boobies also nest on the island.

References

 
Important Bird Areas of Palau
Important Bird Areas of the Caroline Islands
Seabird colonies
Uninhabited islands of Palau
Sonsorol